The Fillmore American Legion Hall, at 80 S. Main St. in Fillmore, Utah, was built in 1924.  It was listed on the National Register of Historic Places in 2011.

It is home of American Legion Post 61.  Millard County had 150 American Legion members in 2019.

References

National Register of Historic Places in Millard County, Utah
Buildings and structures completed in 1924
American Legion buildings